My Secret Identity is a television series starring Jerry O'Connell and Derek McGrath. Originally broadcast from October 9, 1988 to May 25, 1991 on CTV in Canada, the series also aired in syndication in the United States. It was later shown in reruns on the Sci-Fi Channel. The series won the 1989 International Emmy Award for Outstanding Achievement in Programming for Children and Young People.

Synopsis
O'Connell stars as 14-year-old Andrew Clements, who while looking one day for his friend, Dr. Benjamin Jeffcoate (McGrath), trips and is hit by a photon beam, causing him to develop superpowers. He uses these abilities to fight crime, to solve personal problems, and to help others. He hides his powers from his mother, sister, and friends with the exception of Jeffcoate. Andrew initially called himself Ultraman, but this was later dropped.

Powers
In the first season, Andrew must carry around aerosol spray containers and use them to move through the air, as his flying ability is limited; he can make himself nearly weightless, and move up without any problems, but he cannot propel himself through the air or move down without some external force. He can jump quite high and do amazing flips. In the second season, unexplained, Andrew gains the ability to move through the air without the use of aerosol cans. Later in that season, after being struck by the photon beam a second time, Andrew develops superhuman strength but loses his invulnerability.

For the entirety of the series, Andrew loses his powers when exposed to radiation (e.g. electromagnetic waves and x-rays). Starting in episode 10, he loses his powers for 2–3 days after exposure to an x-ray at the dentist. Later in the series, he regains them immediately after the exposure stops.

Setting and characters
The main setting of the show is Toronto, Ontario, Canada, in the fictional suburb of Briarwood. Andrew goes to Briarwood High and his sister Erin goes to another school.

Dr. Jeffcoate (supposedly the fourth-smartest man in the world) is a close friend of the family who lives next door. He is attracted to Mrs. Clements but never tells her.

Cast 
Jerry O'Connell as Andrew Clements
Derek McGrath as Dr. Benjamin Marion Jeffcoate
Christopher Bolton as Kirk Stevens (1989-1991)
Marsha Moreau as Erin Clements
Wanda Cannon as Stephanie Clements
Elizabeth Leslie as Ruth Schellenbach

Episodes

Novel
A novelization of the pilot episode, written by Jovial Bob Stine (R. L. Stine), was released in 1989.

Syndicated stations (United States)

References

External links

1988 American television series debuts
1991 American television series endings
1980s American comic science fiction television series
1990s American comic science fiction television series
1980s American teen sitcoms
1990s American teen sitcoms
1988 Canadian television series debuts
1991 Canadian television series endings
1980s Canadian science fiction television series
1990s Canadian comic science fiction television series
1980s Canadian sitcoms
1990s Canadian teen sitcoms
American children's comedy television series
American children's science fiction television series
American superhero comedy television series
Canadian children's comedy television series
Canadian children's science fiction television series
Canadian superhero comedy television series
Teen superhero television series
CTV Television Network original programming
First-run syndicated television programs in the United States
Television series about teenagers
Television shows filmed in Toronto
Television series by Universal Television